Irene Carswell Peden (born September 25, 1925) is an American engineer who has contributed much to the field of electrical engineering.  She is known for being the first American woman scientist to live and work in the interior of the Antarctic, where she developed new methods to analyze the deep glacial ice by studying the effect it has on radio waves.

Early life and education
Born on September 25, 1925 in Topeka, Kansas, Irene was the oldest of three girls, her mother was also the oldest child of four, in a Swedish immigrant family.  Her mother was a school teacher in math and music education. Her father was in the automobile business. She graduated from Central High School in Kansas City, Missouri.  After graduating from Kansas City Junior College, Irene went on to graduate from the University of Colorado with a degree in electrical engineering in 1947.  She later went to graduate school at Stanford University, where she conducted research for her doctoral dissertation in the Stanford Microwave Lab.   In 1962, Irene became the first woman to earn a PhD in engineering from Stanford.  Both Peden's M.S and Ph.D from Stanford were in electrical engineering.

Professional career
After graduating from the University of Colorado from 1947 to 1949, Irene worked as a junior engineer for Delaware Power and Light Company, and then for Aircraft Radio systems Laboratory of the Stanford Research Institute from 1949 to 1950.  From 1953 to 1954, she worked as a research engineer for Midwest Research Institute.

Once she earned her doctorate degree, Irene joined the electrical engineering faculty at the University of Washington, first as an assistant to associate professor from 1961 to 1971, and then promoted to full professor in 1971.  Later, she was an associate dean of engineering from 1973 to 1977, and then the associate chair of the electrical engineering department from 1983 to 1986. Peden became the Professor Emerita of electrical engineering at the University of Washington in 2002.

Peden has also had her hand in several scientific publications, either writing alone or with others. Some of her works include: "Radio Science", "IEEE Transactions on Antennas and Propagation", "Transactions on Geoscience Electronics".

Work in the Antarctic 
In 1970, Irene became the first American woman engineer or scientist to conduct research in the Antarctic interior.  While there, she conducted research with a grant from the Polar Upper Atmosphere Program at the National Science Foundation. Her work during her time in the Antarctic consisted of characterizing glacial ice. They often worked 12-hour days in temperatures as low as -50 °C. She and her students were the first to measure many important electrical properties of the glacial ice.   Paths in the ice were measured using very low frequency propagation. Structures and other items were found under the ice using very high frequency radio waves. Peden designed the mathematical models and methodology needed to find this characteristics. In 1979 she spent an entire winter at the South Pole, becoming the first woman to do so. Because of the significance of her work, the Advisory Committee on Antarctic Names (US-ACAN) named a line of cliffs near Rhodes Icefall after her scientific contributions, now called Peden Cliffs.

Memberships 
Irene Peden is a member of several scientific organizations. Some of these are the Explorer's Club, the ASEE,  the American Association for the Advancement of Science, the Accreditation Board for Engineering and Technology, the New York Academy of Sciences, and the American Geophysical Union. Other organizations she is a member of include  International Union of Radio Science (URSI), the Society of Women Engineers, National Academy of Engineering, and the Association of Women in Science. She is also an alum of several academic honor societies. These include Tau Beta Pi, Sigma Xi, and Mortar Board.

Awards and honors
This might sound very minor but the author of one of only a tiny number of 'career novels' mentioning that engineering could also be for girls, noted her special thanks to Peden in 1966, presumably for helping with the background reality for young women entering the male-majority profession. Peden received the Society of Women Engineers' Achievement Award in 1973 as well as the U.S. Army's Outstanding Civilian Service Medal in 1987 for her research and work in the Antarctic. Irene Peden was elected member of the National Academy of Engineering in 1993 for her leadership in engineering education in antennas and propagation and contributions to radioscience in the polar region.  Also that same year, the National Science Foundation named her as the Engineer of the Year.  Among her other numerous awards she was inducted into the ASEE Engineering Educators Hall of Fame.  She is also a Fellow of IEEE, which honored her with their Distinguished Achievement Award, the Centennial Medal in 1984, and Third Millennium Medal for 2000. Irene Peden received the Diamond Award from the University of Washington in 2018 which is given to alumni and others who have made great strides in the field of engineering.

References

Sources

External links
United States Antarctic Program
University of Washington Electrical Engineering Bio

1925 births
Living people
American electrical engineers
Explorers of Antarctica
Stanford University alumni
University of Colorado alumni
Members of the United States National Academy of Engineering
United States Army Science Board people
Female polar explorers
Women Antarctic scientists
IEEE Centennial Medal laureates
Fellow Members of the IEEE
University of Washington faculty
American women engineers
Fellows of the American Association for the Advancement of Science
Fellows of the Explorers Club
People from Topeka, Kansas
Engineers from Kansas
21st-century women engineers
American women academics
21st-century American women
American Antarctic scientists